Argeathae or Argeathai was a settlement in ancient Arcadia, Greece. Its location has not been found, but Pausanias wrote that it was located near Nasi, Lycuntes and Scotane, which places it in the southern part of present Achaea. It was located in the Arcadian Azania, near the Soron forest.

References

Populated places in ancient Arcadia
Arcadian city-states
Arcadian Azania
Lost ancient cities and towns
Former populated places in Greece